Oh Jong-hyuk (born February 16, 1983) is a South Korean singer and member of South Korean boy band Click-B.

Personal life
Oh was educated at Dankook University High School, and graduated from Kyonggi University.

Oh began his mandatory military service in 2011. He served as an active duty officer after his six weeks of basic military training at the Pohang Marine Corps Training Center. He was discharged in 2013.

In September 2013, it was revealed that Oh had been dating T-ara member Soyeon for the past three years. After six years of dating, the relationship came to an end in 2016.

In April 2021, Oh announced that he would marry on April 12, 2021 to his non-celebrity girlfriend. As planned, Oh will get married from May 2020, which has to be postponed because of COVID-19. On December 2, 2021, Oh announced through his social media that his wife is pregnant. On July 7th, 2022 his wife gave birth to their first child, a daughter.

Career 

In 1999, Oh debuted as a member of the group Click-B. He later debuted as a soloist in September 2006 with the album Issue under the stage name OJ.

Oh was a cast member in the variety show Law of the Jungle in 2013 and 2014, and appeared in MBC's King of Mask Singer in 2015, under the alias "Lonely Man Leon"

In August 2021, Oh signed with Bless Ent following the expiration of his contract with the former agency.

Discography

Studio albums 
 OJ Issue (2006)
 He's Story Vol. 2 'Cry' (2009)

EPs 
 OK, I'm Ready (2008)
 Heartbreak (2009)

Singles 
 Love is Like That (사랑이 그래요) (2007)
 OJ (2010)
 Run To You, Fly With Cloud (2011)
 Time Is... (시간은...) (2011)
 Love Fades (시들어) feat. Kim Ji-sook (2016)

Filmography

Film

Television series

Television shows

Theater

References

External links
 

1983 births
Living people
South Korean male singers
South Korean male television actors
South Korean male film actors
South Korean male musical theatre actors
South Korean television personalities
Singers from Seoul
Male actors from Seoul
Kyonggi University alumni
DSP Media artists
Republic of Korea Marine Corps personnel
South Korean pop singers
South Korean male idols